MetroX is a rural express bus service operating in the Canadian province of Nova Scotia.  Operated by Halifax Transit, MetroX service is available on three limited-stop fully accessible express routes within the Halifax Regional Municipality. All routes link to downtown Halifax, with one from Upper Tantallon, one from Fall River and Halifax Stanfield International Airport, and one from Porters Lake.

History
The MetroX service began on August 31, 2009.  MetroX was developed designed with the weekday commuter in mind.  When fully rolled out MetroX will bring express transit to Park & Ride lots along 100-series highways within HRM, along the three 100-series highways that lead into the Halifax Regional Municipality; those highways being Highway 102, Highway 103 and Highway 107.  At the end of August, 2009, MetroX service began with weekday service from Tantallon to Downtown Halifax.  In May 2012, daily service along the Highway 102 corridor began between Halifax Stanfield International Airport and Downtown Halifax.  Weekday service on the Highway 107 corridor began on November 18, 2013.

Current Routes
All MetroX routes are limited-stop services, stopping only at major terminals and the rural destinations.

330 Tantallon/Sheldrake Lake

Route 330 Tantallon/Sheldrake Lake provides express service between Upper Tantallon, Sheldrake Lake (Hubley) and Duke/Albemarle Street, along the Highway 103 corridor.  The route stops at the following locations:

  Upper Tantallon (Tantallon Plaza)
  Sheldrake Lake (Hubley)
  Duke/Albemarle Street

The route operates on three variations, Halifax to Sheldrake Lake onto Upper Tantallon, Halifax to Sheldrake Lake and Halifax to Upper Tantallon (and vice versa).

320 Airport/Fall River
Route 320 Airport provides express service between Halifax Stanfield International Airport and Duke/Albemarle Street, along Highway 102, Highway 118 and Highway 111. The route stops at the following locations:

  Halifax Stanfield International Airport
  Aerotech Business Park
  Fall River
  Dartmouth (Bridge Terminal)
  Duke/Albemarle Street

370 Porters Lake

Route 370 Porters Lake provides service in the Highway 107 corridor between Duke/Albemarle Street and Porters Lake.  The route stops at the following locations:

 Porters Lake
 Dartmouth (Bridge Terminal)
 Duke/Albemarle Street

Fare Structure
Effective September 30, 2013
The MetroExpress service has its own fare structure, separate from the rest of the Halifax Transit system. Cash fares cost an extra one dollar over and above the regular fares. MetroExpress has its own monthly bus pass, the MetroX Pass, which can be used on any Halifax Transit service. Passengers may use regular transit tickets or monthly bus passes (MetroPass), but must deposit an additional one dollar into the farebox.  If  MetroLink passes or transfers are used an additional fifty cents must be deposited

See also 

 Halifax Transit
 Halifax Regional Municipality

References

External links 
 MetroX Main Page

Transport in Halifax, Nova Scotia
Transit agencies in Nova Scotia
Bus transport in Nova Scotia
Paratransit services in Canada
Bus rapid transit in Canada